The Beatles were a rock group from Liverpool, England. This timeline chronicles their activities.

 

Codes

Pre-1940

|}

1940s

|}

1950s

|}

1960

|}

1961

¸

|}

1962

|}

1963

|}

1964

|}

1965

|}

1966

|}

1967

|}

1968

|}

1969

|}

1970s

|}

1980s

|}

1990s

|}

2000s

|}

2010s

|}

2020s

|}

Album and single releases

References

Sources 
 
 
 
 

 
 
 
 
 
 
 
 

Timelines of music